Muscula is a genus of moths in the family Erebidae.

Most species were previously placed in the genus Eilema.

Species
 Muscula muscula (Staudinger, 1899) (Asia Minor)
 Muscula brevifurca (Wiltshire, 1957) (Asia Minor)

References

Lithosiina
Moth genera